Ronquerolles is a commune in the Val-d'Oise department and Île-de-France region of France.

See also
Communes of the Val-d'Oise department

References

External links
Official website 

Association of Mayors of the Val d'Oise 

Communes of Val-d'Oise